Humanitas may refer to:

 The word humanitas, created by Cicero to describe a good human 
 Humanitas (publishing house), a Romanian publishing house
 Humanitas (journal)
 Humanitas Prize, an award given to motion pictures and television shows
 Humanitas University, a private medical school in Rozzano (Milan), Italy
 HUMANITAS (Grand Lodge), a German grand lodge in the Liberal Masonic tradition
 The Humanitas Programme, a series of Visiting Professorships at the Universities of Oxford and Cambridge